Vera Day (born 4 August 1933) is an English film and television actress. She was born in London just before the war and grew up in Forest Gate, East London.

Early career

Leaving school at 15, she had various jobs before finding employment in a hair salon. Modelling for hairstylists, she became a full-time model. One day she saw an advertisement in a theatrical paper for showgirls, so taking time off work and with the smallest bikini she could find, she attended the auditions. Even though she was untrained in singing and dancing, she caught the attention of Jack Hylton, who gave her a part in Wish You Were Here at the London Casino in 1953. She was only nineteen. Val Guest was at the opening night and left a note for her at the stage door to contact him. This led to Vera being cast in the film Dance Little Lady. However, she had to ask permission from Jack Hylton, for she was under contract for two more shows, which ended up being Pal Joey at the Princes Theatre and Jokers Wild with the Crazy Gang at the Victoria Palace Theatre.

Film career

From the late 1950s, Day was a popular figure in British films, a glamorous blonde bombshell who appeared most memorably in the classic Stanley Baker drama Hell Drivers (1957) and the Hammer science fiction film Quatermass 2 (1957). Her other film roles include that of George Cole's girlfriend in Mario Zampi's comedy Too Many Crooks (1959) and as the heroine in the horror film Womaneater (1958), one of her few leading parts.

Many years later, Day appeared in a supporting role in Guy Ritchie's Lock, Stock, and Two Smoking Barrels (1998).

Selected filmography

 Dance Little Lady (1954)
 The Crowded Day (1954)
 It's a Great Day (1955)
 A Kid for Two Farthings (1955)
 Fun at St. Fanny's (1955)
 Quatermass 2 (1957)
 Hell Drivers (1957)
 The Prince and the Showgirl (1957)
 I Was Monty's Double (1958) – Angela
 The Woman Eater (1958)
 Up the Creek (1958) – Lily
 The Haunted Strangler (1958) – Pearl
 Too Many Crooks (1959) – Charmaine
 And the Same to You (1960) – Cynthia Tripp
 Trouble with Eve (1960) – Daisy Freeman
 The Trunk (1961) – Diane
 Watch It, Sailor! (1961) – Shirley Hornett
 A Stitch in Time (1963) – Betty
 Saturday Night Out (1964) – Arlene
 Lock, Stock and Two Smoking Barrels (1998) – Tanya
 The Riddle (2007) – Sadie Miller

References

External links

1935 births
Living people
British film actresses
British television actresses
Actresses from London